Leucine rich repeat containing 7 also known as LRRC7,  Densin-180, or LAP1 is a protein which in humans is encoded by the LRRC7 gene.

Structure 

Found to be densely associated to the postsynaptic density (PSD), it has been characterised as a 188 kDa (originally thought to be 180 kDa, hence nomenclature), 1495 residues long, brain-specific protein containing 16 leucine-rich repeats (LRRs) within the 500 N-terminal residues, and one Psd95/Discs large/Zona occludens (PDZ) domain within the 200 C-terminal residues. Originally postulated to have an apparent transmembrane domain, it has now been shown that the protein has numerous phosphorylation sites both N- and C-term of this domain, and that protein is therefore cytoplasmic; palmitoylation is thought to occur near the N-terminus of the protein which would account for localisation of the protein at the PSD.

Interactions
LRRC7 has been shown to interact with CDH2.

The currently exposed interactions of Densin-180 portray the protein as a promiscuous player amongst key synaptic players, fitting with the original observation of the protein’s dense presence among core PSD proteins by Mary B. Kennedy's Laboratory. Identified interaction partners include: CaMKII-alpha, alpha-Actinin and NR2B (via CaMKII-alpha), Cav1.3 (L-type Ca2+) channels, MAGUIN-1, Shank, PSD-95 (via Shank and MAGUIN-1), beta-Catenin, delta-Catenins and NCadherin (via the Catenins). The nature and function of these interactions, detailed in tables 1-1 and 1-2, portray Densin-180 as a key interactor in the midst of receptor proteins, scaffolding proteins and structural proteins. [number of sources - referenced in - Subcellular localisation of recombinant Densin-180 clones expressed in HEK293 TSA cells Ranatunga, J.M. (2011) Subcellular localisation of recombinant Densin-180 clones expressed in HEK293 TSA cells. Masters thesis, UCL (University College London). http://discovery.ucl.ac.uk/1322972/]

It is also quite possible that Densin-180 dimerises or multimerises through interactions between its PDZ domain and its own terminal amino acid residues. [Subcellular localisation of recombinant Densin-180 clones expressed in HEK293 TSA cells
Ranatunga, J.M. (2011) Subcellular localisation of recombinant Densin-180 clones expressed in HEK293 TSA cells. Masters thesis, UCL (University College London). http://discovery.ucl.ac.uk/1322972/]

References

Further reading

Add—a very detailed thesis with preliminary experiments and theories about the function of Densin-180 entitled Subcellular localisation of recombinant Densin-180 clones expressed in HEK293 TSA cells
http://discovery.ucl.ac.uk/1322972/

LRR proteins